Perdona bonita, pero Lucas me quería a mí (English title: Excuse Me Darling, But Lucas Loved Me) was a Spanish film directed by Dunia Ayaso and Félix Sabroso in 1997. The film was an ensemble comedy in which the characters exhibited extreme stereotypes, causing some criticism that it exaggerated gay characters, to which the directors responded that heterosexual characters were also exaggerated and based on clichés. It was one of the highest-grossing Spanish films of the nineties, despite being filmed on a budget.

Synopsis
Until Lucas appeared in their lives, Dani, Carlos, and Toni led a quiet existence without major concerns. They shared almost everything: the house, housework, dogs, their homosexuality, and debts. The debts finally forced them to rent one of the bedrooms of their apartment. Lucas moved in with his long hair, his charming smile, and his muscular body to completely change the life and direction of their home. Lucas turned up dead but ... Who killed him? All had reasons for doing so, or maybe not.

Casting

External links
 

1997 films
1990s Spanish-language films
Spanish LGBT-related films
Madrid in fiction
1990s Spanish films